Adam Herbert Wakenshaw VC (9 June 1914 – 27 June 1942) was an English recipient of the Victoria Cross, the highest and most prestigious award for gallantry in the face of the enemy that can be awarded to British and Commonwealth forces.

Details
Wakenshaw was 28 years old, and a private in the 9th Battalion, The Durham Light Infantry, British Army during the Second World War, and was awarded a Victoria Cross for his actions on 27 June 1942 in Mersa Matruh, Egypt, where he was killed in combat.

Citation

The Medal
His Victoria Cross medal is displayed at the Durham Light Infantry Museum & Durham Art Gallery, Durham City, England. His widow and son received the medal from King George VI at Buckingham Palace on 4 March 1943

References

British VCs of World War 2 (John Laffin, 1997)
Monuments to Courage (David Harvey, 1999)
The Register of the Victoria Cross (This England, 1997)

External links
Private A.H. Wakenshaw in The Art of War exhibition at the UK National Archives

1914 births
1942 deaths
Military personnel from Newcastle upon Tyne
Durham Light Infantry soldiers
British Army personnel killed in World War II
British World War II recipients of the Victoria Cross
British Army recipients of the Victoria Cross